Harri J. Rantala (born 2 October 1980) is a Finnish film director. He has directed films like Kotiinpaluu – Return and Nurmoo – Shout from the plain. He is a native of Nurmo, Finland.

Filmography 

Director:
 2004: The Sacrifice
 2005: The Road of Mutala
 2006: Suudelma
 2006: M. A. Numminen: Sedena con la mia donnna nel parco del parlamento
 2007: Daughters of Snow
 2009: Nurmoo – Shout from the plain
 2010: Return
 2013: Long Range Patrol
 2015: Midsummer girl
 2015: Puppeteer

Actor:
 2000: Pieni pyhiinvaellus
 2002: Luokkajuhla
 2005: The Road of Mutala
 2007: Colorado Avenue
 2007: Black Ice
 2009: Nurmoo – Shout from the plain
 2011: One Man's Movie
 2012: Once Upon a Time in the North

Miscellaneous Crew:
 2005: Jopet Show
 2005: Piilopaikka kahdelle
 2006: Ilonen talo
 2006: Mystery of the Wolf
 2007: The New Mankind
 2007: Colorado Avenue
 2007: Ganes
 2008: Protectors
 2008. Joku kaltaiseni
 2008 Tears of April
 2008 Tukka auki

References

External links 
 

1980 births
Living people
People from Seinäjoki
Finnish film directors